The women's 200 metre breaststroke was a swimming event held as part of the swimming at the 1924 Summer Olympics programme. It was the first appearance of the event, as women only swam freestyle events before this Games. The competition was held on Wednesday July 16, 1924 and on Friday July 18, 1924.

Records
These were the standing world and Olympic records (in minutes) prior to the 1924 Summer Olympics.

In the first heat Agnes Geraghty set the first Olympic record with 3:27.6 minutes. This record was not bettered during this competition.

Results

Semifinals

Wednesday July 16, 1924: The fastest two in each semi-final and the fastest third-placed from across the semi-finals advanced.

Semifinal 1

Mietje Baron was disqualified, because she touched the wall with only one hand.

Semifinal 2

Semifinal 3

Final

Friday July 18, 1924:

References

External links
Olympic Report
 

Swimming at the 1924 Summer Olympics
1924 in women's swimming
Women's events at the 1924 Summer Olympics